Eli Cross , is a Canadian politician in Newfoundland and Labrador, Canada. He was elected to the Newfoundland and Labrador House of Assembly in the 2011 provincial election. A member of the Progressive Conservative Party of Newfoundland and Labrador, he represented the electoral district of Bonavista North. In the 2015 election, Cross was defeated by Liberal Derrick Bragg in the new Fogo Island-Cape Freels riding.

Prior to his election to the legislature, Cross served as mayor of Wesleyville, and subsequently as mayor of the amalgamated town of New-Wes-Valley.

Electoral record

|-

|-

|-

|}

|-

|-
 
|Liberal
|Paul Kean
|align="right"|1,518
|align="right"|40.94
|align="right"|
|-
 
|NDP
|John Coaker
|align="right"|467
|align="right"|12.59
|align="right"|
|}

 
|Liberal
|Thomas Lush
|align="right"|3470
|align="right"|
|align="right"|

 
|NDP
|Ingwald Feltham
|align="right"|117
|align="right"|
|align="right"|
|-
|}

References

External links
 PC Party biography

Living people
Progressive Conservative Party of Newfoundland and Labrador MHAs
Mayors of places in Newfoundland and Labrador
1957 births
21st-century Canadian politicians